Cosby is a surname. Notable people with the surname include:

Alexander Cosby (1685–1742), Irish military officer
Andrew Cosby (born 1968), American comic book creator, film producer, and screenwriter 
Bill Cosby (born 1937), American actor, comedian, and alleged sex offender
Camille Cosby (born 1944), American author and wife of Bill Cosby
Dabney Cosby (1793–1862), American architect and builder
Dudley Cosby, 1st Baron Sydney (1730–1774), Irish politician and diplomat
Ennis Cosby (1969–1997), American student and son of Bill Cosby who was murdered in 1997
Erika Cosby (born 1965), artist and daughter of Bill Cosby
Francis Cosby (1510–1580), English soldier and settler in Ireland
George B. Cosby (1830–1909), Confederate States Army officer
Gerry Cosby (1909–1996), American ice hockey player and businessman
Henry Cosby (1928–2002), American songwriter and record producer
Jessica Cosby (born 1982), American hammer thrower
Joseph Hathaway Cosby (1902–1998), American pastor, US Army chaplain, and the second President of Hargrave Military Academy
Phillips Cosby (1729–1808), Royal Navy officer
Quan Cosby (born 1982), American football player
Rita Cosby (born 1964), TV reporter
William Cosby (1690–1736), British nobleman and governor of the New York Colony

Similar 

 Crosby
Crosbie